Steven Korteling (born 16 January 1984) is a Dutch former professional tennis player.

Korteling, the 2004 Dutch national champion, reached a career high singles ranking of 423 in the world. In 2005 he made his ATP Tour main debut in the Dutch Open, losing in the first round to sixth seed Victor Hănescu. As a doubles player he featured in the main draw at Rotterdam in 2006 and won three ITF Futures titles.

ITF Futures titles

Doubles: (3)

References

External links
 
 

1984 births
Living people
Dutch male tennis players
20th-century Dutch people
21st-century Dutch people